Rhinanthus minor, known as yellow rattle, is a herbaceous wildflower in the genus Rhinanthus in the family Orobanchaceae (the broomrapes). It has circumpolar distribution in Europe, Russia, western Asia, and northern North America. The fruit is a dry capsule, with loose, rattling seeds.

The preferred habitat of Rhinanthus minor is dry fields or meadows; it tolerates a wide range of soil types. It flowers in the summer between May and September. It is hemiparasitic, notably on Poaceae (grasses) and Fabaceae (legumes), and farmers consider it to be a pest, as it reduces grass growth. 

Yellow rattle is used to create or restore wildflower meadows, where it maintains species diversity by suppressing dominant grasses and the recycling of soil nutrients. The seed is sown thinly onto grassland from August to November—to germinate the following spring, the seeds need to remain in the soil throughout the winter months.

Description

Yellow rattle is a herbaceous annual plant that resembles the larger greater yellow rattle (Rhinanthus angustifolius).

The leaves are sessile (they grow directly from the stem), somewhat heart-shaped at the base, otherwise ovate (oval-shaped) to lanceolate (shaped like a lance tip), dentate (toothed) and scabrid (a little rough to the touch). The stem, which stands upright, can be simple or branched, is four-angled and often streaked or spotted black.

The silvery-coloured fruit is a dry capsule, which contains loose, rattling seeds when ripe that give the plant one of its common names.

The herbalist Nicholas Culpeper, in his The English Physician (first published in 1652), wrote of yellow rattle as being "good for cough, or dimness of sight". The plant has a reputation of being toxic to animals. The seeds contain iridoids which cause them to have a bitter taste.

Taxonomy
Rhinanthus minor is a flowering plant in the genus Rhinanthus in the family Orobanchaceae. It was described by the Swedish taxonomist Carl Linnaeus in volume 3 of Amoenitates Academici (1756). The species name is derived from Ancient Greek and means 'nose flower', which is in reference to the shape of the upper lip of the corolla. Minor means 'smaller'.

Synonyms include:

 Alectorolophus minor (Dumort)
 Fistularia minor Kuntze
 Rhinanthus crista-galli L., the name Linnaeus gave the species
 Rhinanthus crista-galli var. fallax (Wimm. & Grab.) Druce
 Rhinanthus rigidus Chabert
 Rhinanthus stenophyllus (Schur) Schinz & Thell
 Rhinanthus crista-galli var. fallax (Wimm. & Grab.) Druce
 Rhinanthus kyrollae Chabert
 Rhinanthus borealis subsp. kyrollae (Chabert) Pennell

Distribution and ecology

Rhinanthus minor is found in Europe, western Russia, western Siberia, northern USA and throughout Canada. The preferred habitat of Rhinanthus minor is dry fields or meadows, where its flowering period is in the summer between May and September, but it can thrive with semi-natural species-rich water-meadows. It can tolerate a wide range of soil types but does not grow where the soil has a pH less than 5.0. Yellow rattle flowers are pollinated by bumblebees during the summer months; the plant is also capable of self-fertilization. 

Yellow rattle is an annual wildflower. It is hemiparasitic, in that it can gain its nutrients by penetrating the roots of neighbouring green plants with its own roots, but is a facultative parasite, in that it acts opportunistically when in contact with a root. The hemiparasitic nature of yellow rattle can result in stunted, unbranched individual specimens. The plant can associate with many different host species, notably Poaceae (grasses) and Fabaceae (legumes).

In Ireland and Scotland, yellow rattle is often associated with Machair habitat, which consists of coastal grassland. The seeds are spread effectively by traditional hay-making practices. Farmers seek to remove it since it affects yields by weakening grass; it is an indicator of poor grassland.

Effects on plant community structure

Yellow rattle can change the structure of plant communities through its parasitism. Vulnerability to attack varies across host taxa, with forbs developing lignified barriers to obstruct the parasite.

Research, including that at the UK's Centre for Ecology and Hydrology, has shown that encouraging it to grow in hay meadows greatly increases biodiversity, by restricting grass growth and thereby allowing other species to thrive. As of 2021 a majority of studies had found positive or neutral effects of the introduction of Rhinanthus spp. on grassland species richness and diversity, with most finding a negative effect on grasses.

Conservation status
Rhinanthus minor is found in low-lying fields with poor quality soil. It is currently not under threat; as such it is rated as of Least Concern (LC).

Being an annual, it is not found in regularly mown or grazed grassland where the seeds are not provided with an opportunity to spread over the ground. The lack of a seed bank for yellow rattle means that it depends on seed produced from plants during the previous year.

Pasture and hay field infestation
In the northeastern United States, yellow rattle is considered a pest, as it decreases crop yields of grass and hay. Where the plant is found to have infested farmland it has to be suppressed; non-herbicidal strategies for removing it include the application of wood ash and sawdust on affected pastures.

Uses and cultivation

Yellow rattle is used to proactively create or restore wildflower meadows. It is used to reduce the dominance of grasses, when more expensive methods, such as removing the nutrient-rich topsoil, or impractical methods, such as changing the timing and intensity of grazing, cannot be used. This improves the chances of other species of flowers becoming established. According to Natural England, the optimum density of yellow rattle plants needed to enable other species to be introduced is 100 to 200 per m2. Studies have shown that the plant's role in maintaining species diversity is through differential growth suppression effects and enhanced soil nutrient recycling.

The yellow rattle seed is sown thinly onto grassland where gaps have been created, or where all the grass has been cut back and the clippings removed. Seeds can be also be introduced by the spreading of green hay. The grass should be kept short until the beginning of March, after which the seedlings become established.

After the yellow rattle plants have germinated and matured, the fruits shed their seeds. The meadow hay is cut and removed to encourage the growth introduced wild flowers. The seed, which is short-lived, is sown in the autumn, using seed harvested that year. The seeds have to remain on or under the ground throughout the cold months of winter in order to germinate in the spring.

Notes

References

Sources

Further reading

External links
 
 

minor
Parasitic plants
Rhinanthus minor
Rhinanthus minor
Rhinanthus minor
Rhinanthus minor
Rhinanthus minor
Rhinanthus minor
Rhinanthus minor
Rhinanthus minor
Flora of Latvia
Flora of Lithuania
Rhinanthus minor
Rhinanthus minor
Flora of Romania
Rhinanthus minor
Rhinanthus minor
Rhinanthus minor